Arsenal Football Club, an association football club based in Islington, London, was founded in 1886 as Dial Square. They became the first southern member admitted into the Football League in 1893, having spent their first four seasons solely participating in cup tournaments and friendlies. The club's name, which shortly changed to Woolwich Arsenal, was shortened to Arsenal in 1914, a year after moving to Highbury. Despite finishing fifth in the Second Division in 1914–15, Arsenal rejoined the First Division at the expense of local rivals Tottenham Hotspur when football resumed after the First World War. Since that time, they have not fallen below the first tier of the English football league system and hold the record for the longest uninterrupted period in the top flight. The club's first team have competed in numerous national and continental organised competitions, and all players who have played between 1 and 24 such matches are listed below.

Since Arsenal's first competitive match, more than 500 players have failed to reach 25 appearances for the club. Many of these players have spent only a short period of their career at Arsenal before seeking opportunities in other teams; some players had their careers cut short by injury, while others left for other reasons. John Kosmina, who joined from Adelaide City in 1978, only made four appearances for Arsenal, before returning to his native Australia where his goalscoring record was prolific. Vladimir Petrović featured 22 times as an Arsenal first-teamer, and later forged a managerial career, coaching Red Star Belgrade and the Serbia national team. Andy Cole, who played one league match as a youngster for Arsenal, moved to Newcastle United where he won the Premier League Golden Boot in 1993–94, and enjoyed further success at Manchester United in the mid-to-late 1990s. David Bentley and Rohan Ricketts left Arsenal in pursuit of first-team football, and both went on to play for Tottenham Hotspur at certain stages of their careers.

Several players spent brief periods with Arsenal on loan from other clubs. Michal Papadopulos made one appearance in the 2003–04 season and later earned full international caps with the Czech Republic. Midfielder Kim Källström joined on a six-month spell and was part of the club's 2014 FA Cup-winning squad.

Key
The list is ordered first by date of debut, and then if necessary in alphabetical order.
Appearances as a substitute are included. This feature of the game was introduced in the Football League at the start of the 1965–66 season.
Statistics are correct up to and including the match played on 31 August 2022. Where a player left the club permanently after this date, his statistics are updated to his date of leaving.

Players

Footnotes

References
General

Specific

 
Arsenal
Players
Association football player non-biographical articles